Time Honoured Ghosts is the sixth studio album released by the English rock group, Barclay James Harvest in October 1975. The title was suggested by the wife of Harvey Lisberg, the band's manager at the time, though it is believed that she was quoting from another unknown source. It was recorded between May and July 1975 at the "His Masters Wheels" studio in San Francisco. It was produced by Elliot Mazer and released in October on the Polydor Records label.

Track listing 

In 2021, the album was again remastered with a DVD which had a 5.1 surround sound version of the original tapes of this album. Also included on the DVD are promotional films for "Jonathan", "Titles", "Moongirl", "One Night", and "Beyond The Grave". The song "Jonathan" is inspired by Richard Bach's 1972 novel, Jonathan Livingston Seagull.

Personnel
Barclay James Harvest
John Lees – electric and acoustic guitars, vocals
Les Holroyd – bass, acoustic guitars, vocals
Stuart "Woolly" Wolstenholme – keyboards, vocals
Mel Pritchard – drums, percussion

References

1975 albums
Barclay James Harvest albums
Albums produced by Elliot Mazer
Polydor Records albums